Albert Marrama Esteve (born 18 February 1983) is a Spanish retired footballer who played as a goalkeeper.

Club career
Born in La Vall d'Uixó, Province of Castellón, Marrama was brought up at Valencia CF's youth system, but never made it past the reserve team during six years. He also served a loan at Valencian Community neighbours Hércules CF.

Released by Valencia in summer 2007, Marrama made his professional debut in 2007–08, with Polideportivo Ejido in the second division, but appeared only once in a relegation-ending season. Subsequently, he resumed his career in the fourth level, having a brief passage in the third with Moratalla CF (suffering another relegation); from March–May 2009 he was on trial at Scottish side Dundee United and PAS Giannina F.C. of Greece, but nothing came of it.

In late June 2011, after another spell in the latter country with GS Ilioupolis, Marrama signed with Nea Salamis Famagusta FC of the Cypriot First Division. He retired from football after only a couple of months however, aged only 28, and returned to his first club Valencia as youth teams' goalkeeping coach.

References

External links

1983 births
Living people
People from Plana Baixa
Sportspeople from the Province of Castellón
Spanish footballers
Footballers from the Valencian Community
Association football goalkeepers
Segunda División players
Segunda División B players
Tercera División players
Valencia CF Mestalla footballers
Hércules CF players
Polideportivo Ejido footballers
CD Teruel footballers
Football League (Greece) players
Ilioupoli F.C. players
Cypriot First Division players
Nea Salamis Famagusta FC players
Spain youth international footballers
Spanish expatriate footballers
Expatriate footballers in Greece
Expatriate footballers in Cyprus
Spanish expatriate sportspeople in Greece
Spanish expatriate sportspeople in Cyprus